Erich Peter Wohlfarth (December 7, 1924 in Gleiwitz, Upper Silesia – March 1988, in London)  was a theoretical physicist. He is known for his work in magnetism, in particular the Stoner–Wohlfarth model he developed together with his teacher E.C. Stoner.

See also
Metamagnetism

References

Further reading

 
 

 

1924 births
1988 deaths
Jewish emigrants from Nazi Germany to the United Kingdom
20th-century German physicists
People from Gliwice
People from the Province of Upper Silesia
Kindertransport refugees
Jewish physicists
German emigrants to the United Kingdom